Lapinjärvi is a rather small lake in the middle of the Lapinjärvi municipality in Uusimaa region, Finland. There are 27 small lakes in Finland with the same name.

References

Geography of Uusimaa
Lakes of Lapinjärvi